Franklin H. Moreau (born September 9, 1976) is a former American football running back in the National Football League. He was drafted by the Kansas City Chiefs in the fourth round (115th overall) of the 2000 NFL Draft and also played for the Jacksonville Jaguars. He played college football for the Louisville Cardinals.

Moreau played two seasons in the NFL, one with the Chiefs and another with the Jaguars.

References

1976 births
Living people
People from Pineville, Louisiana
Players of American football from Louisiana
American football running backs
Louisville Cardinals football players
Kansas City Chiefs players
Jacksonville Jaguars players
Sportspeople from Rapides Parish, Louisiana